Liu Xinqi (born October 1956) is former Chinese military officer and politician who served as commander of Xinjiang Production and Construction Corps from 2011 to 2017, until he was investigated by the party's anti-graft watchdog and China's top anti-corruption agency.

Biography
Liu was born in Shanghe County, Shandong, in October 1956. He joined the Chinese Communist Party in April 1977, and enlisted in the People's Liberation Army in October 1975. From October 1975 to June 2001, he successively worked in the 4th Division, 3rd Division, and 1st Division of the Xinjiang Production and Construction Corps. He moved up the ranks to become deputy commander in June 2001. After this office was terminated in November 2011, he was promoted again to become commander, serving until April 2017.

Downfall
On 24 May 2017, he was put under investigation for alleged "serious violations of discipline" by the Central Commission for Discipline Inspection (CCDI), the party's internal disciplinary body, and the National Supervisory Commission, the highest anti-corruption agency of China. He was expelled from the Chinese Communist Party and downgraded to division director level of non leadership positions. On June 27, his qualification for delegates to the 12th National People's Congress was terminated. His deputy Yang Fulin was placed under investigation in July 2021.

References

1956 births
Living people
People from Jinan
People's Republic of China politicians from Shandong
Chinese Communist Party politicians from Shandong
Delegates to the 12th National People's Congress